Kande Yaka translated as spirit of the mountain or rock in English is a popular spirit invoked during  religious rituals of the indigenous Vedda people of Sri Lanka.

References

Vedda